Buryan may refer to:
 Buryan, alternative name for Burban, Iran
 St Buryan, a civil parish and village in Cornwall
 Jan Buryán, Czech football player
 Oleg Buryan, Russian artist